Kris Thomas Mangum (born August 15, 1973) is a former American football player who played tight end for the Carolina Panthers of the National Football League throughout his entire NFL career. He attended the University of Mississippi. His father, John Mangum, Sr. and his brother, John Mangum, Jr. are both former NFL players.

Early life
Kris Thomas Mangum was born on August 15, 1973 in Magee, Mississippi. He is the son of John Mangum Sr. (1942-1994), who is best known as the defensive tackle for the Boston Patriots from 1966-1967. Kris is also the brother of John Mangum Jr., a former NFL player better known as the defensive back for the Chicago Bears from 1990-1998.

High school career
At Magee High School of Magee, Mississippi, Mangum caught 36 passes for 640 yards and eight touchdowns and added 113 tackles, four sacks, two interceptions and two fumble recoveries as a senior.

College career
Mangum graduated from high school in 1992 and first enrolled at the University of Alabama. In his freshman year at Alabama, Mangum played in eight games mostly on special teams for the Crimson Tide football team. Mangum was part of the 1993 Sugar Bowl and national champion Alabama team of 1992. In 1993, Mangum transferred to the University of Mississippi and sat out the season for the Ole Miss Rebels. He ended his college football career ranked 14th all-time in receptions at Ole Miss, collecting 74 catches for 729 yards during three seasons. As a junior in 1995, he was a first-team All-Southeastern Conference selection, while making nine starts.  In his senior season of 1996, Mangum made 29 receptions for 264 yards and 2 touchdowns and was a first-team All-SEC selection. Mangum led the SEC with 36 catches for 391 yards and two touchdowns, the most receptions by a Rebels tight end since Wesley Walls established the mark in 1988. Mangum graduated with a B.A. in public administration from Mississippi in 1996.

In 1996, he was a finalist for the Conerly Trophy.

NFL career
Mangum spent his first six years of his NFL career as a backup to former Panther tight end, and fellow Ole Miss alum, Wesley Walls. Upon his retirement, he was currently the longest tenured player on offense for the Panthers. He scored his first NFL touchdown on a 15-yard reception against the Kansas City Chiefs in 2000. Mangum produced career highs of 34 catches, 497 receiving yards and three touchdowns in 2004.

Post-NFL career
On February 28, 2007, he officially retired from the NFL.  In 2008, he took a position as a replacement tight ends coach at the Southern Miss. In 2009, Mangum became a loan officer with Magnolia State Bank of Mississippi. He currently serves as CEO.

Personal life
Kris has four children: Ally, Molly, Macy and Kristofer Jr.

References

1973 births
Living people
American football tight ends
Carolina Panthers players
Ole Miss Rebels football players
People from Magee, Mississippi
Players of American football from Mississippi
People from Petal, Mississippi